The 1896 Wisconsin Badgers football team represented the University of Wisconsin in the 1896 Western Conference football season.  In their first season under head coach Philip King, the Badgers compiled a 7–1–1 record (2–0–1 against Western Conference opponents), shut out six of nine opponents, outscored all opponents by a combined total of 206 to 30, and won the first Western Conference championship.

Wisconsin played three conference games: a victory over Chicago (24–0) on November 7; a victory over Minnesota (6–0) on November 21; and a tie with Northwestern (6–6) on November 26. Wisconsin's sole loss was to the Carlisle Indians (18–8) in a night game played indoors and under the lights at the Chicago Coliseum before a crowd of 16,000 persons. Wisconsin did not play another night game until 1953.

Four Wisconsin players were selected to the 1896 All-Western football team published in the Chicago Inter Ocean: end Chester Brown, tackle J. F. A. "Sunny" Pyre, guard John E. Ryan, and halfback John "Ikey" Karel. John R. Richards was the team captain.

Schedule

References

Wisconsin
Wisconsin Badgers football seasons
Big Ten Conference football champion seasons
Wisconsin Badgers football